The molecular formula C10H13ClN2 may refer to:

 Chlordimeform
 meta-Chlorophenylpiperazine
 para-Chlorophenylpiperazine